Nogo is a small unincorporated community in Smyrna Township, Pope County, Arkansas, United States. It is part of the Russellville Micropolitan Statistical Area.

The elevation is 1,720 feet above sea level.

References

Unincorporated communities in Pope County, Arkansas
Unincorporated communities in Arkansas
Russellville, Arkansas micropolitan area